Ursuline High School is a private  college preparatory Roman Catholic high school in Youngstown, Ohio. It operates as part of the Roman Catholic Diocese of Youngstown, Ohio. Founded in 1905 by the Ursuline Sisters, Ursuline was an all-women's academy until 1930.

History
Around the start of the 20th century, Ursuline High School began service to the ministry of Catholic Education as a simple day school for girls on West Rayen Avenue. With an initial enrollment of 25 girls, the Ursuline Academy of the Holy Name of Jesus was founded, the predecessor of today's Ursuline High School. The original curriculum stressed classical studies, language skills, doctrinal religion and strict discipline.

In the years following World War I, Youngstown, Ohio witnessed an unmatched period of growth and prosperity. Likewise, the Academy flourished and outgrew its Rayen Avenue convent building. The Chauncey Andrews Estate was purchased in February 1919, thus beginning the “Wick Avenue Era,” reflective of Ursuline's current home on Wick Avenue on the north side of Youngstown. The Ursulines began a fundraising drive almost immediately upon moving into the Andrews Estate to build a new school that could accommodate 400 students. Groundbreaking was held in 1924, and in April 1925 the student body moved into a three-story brick building on Bryson Street.

The school became coeducational, admitting male students as the school's population increased.

Academics
The instructional program at Ursuline High School is designed for the college-bound student but is flexible enough to meet the needs of most students. Ursuline offers Honors and Advanced Placement sections in English, French, Spanish, American History, American Government, science and mathematics to challenge students who are gifted in those particular areas.

Athletics
Ursuline High School has participated in high school athletics and has been a member of the Ohio High School Athletic Association (OHSAA) for many years. Currently, Ursuline fields 17 varsity teams for both boys and girls and celebrates a long-standing athletic rivalry with Cardinal Mooney High School, another Diocese of Youngstown high school located on Youngstown's south side.

Ohio High School Athletic Association State Championships

 Baseball—1988, 2000
 Football—2000, 2008, 2009, 2010
 Boys golf—1975, 1976
 Boys basketball—1994
 Girls basketball—2004

Notable alumni
Pat Bilon, actor
Mike Echols, former National Football League player
Bob Hagan, American politician
Tim Hagan, American politician
Paul Maguire, former American Football League player, TV sportscaster
Ed O'Neill, actor
Darrell K. Smith, former Canadian Football League All-Star
Tony Hinchcliffe, comedian  
Jim Cummings, voice actor
Mark Dailey, Newscaster

References

External links
Official website

Roman Catholic Diocese of Youngstown
High schools in Mahoning County, Ohio
Education in Youngstown, Ohio
Catholic secondary schools in Ohio
Ursuline schools